The Chandigarh Hockey Stadium is a field hockey stadium at Chandigarh, India. It was the home of the Chandigarh Dynamos of the Premier Hockey League.  It has a seating capacity of 30,000 people. It is the second largest terrace field hockey stadium in the world.

Important tournaments held here include Indira Gandhi International Gold Cup, Asian School Hockey, National School Games Twice, All India Women Festival, Indo-Uzabekistak 1977, Indo Pan American Hockey 1995, All India Hockey Tournaments, and Punjab Gold Cup.

It later served as the home ground for World Series Hockey's local franchise, Chandigarh Comets.

References

External links

Indo-Pak tie: UT top brass to play hockey too
https://web.archive.org/web/20120407233712/http://chandigarh.nic.in/dept_sports2.htm

Field hockey venues in India
Buildings and structures in Chandigarh
Sports venues in Chandigarh
Field hockey in Punjab, India
Year of establishment missing
2007 establishments in Punjab, India
Sports venues completed in 2007